Faze Alone is the debut album by R&B artist Faze. It was released in 2004 by Solomon Arueya's Westside Music Lagos Publishing rights rest with Westside Music. Guest artists and producers include OJB Jezreel, Cobhams Asuquo, Paul Runz and Niyola.

Chart performance and sales
"Faze Alone" was the first song made available to the public prior to the album's release. It sold 1.2million units in its first month of release and reached #1 on charts such as Cosmo FM (Enugu), Rhythm FM (Lagos), and Ray Power FM (Lagos). The second single "Angel Gabriella" reached the top ten and become a household choice in Nigeria.

Track listing
"Intro" – 1:14
"Miss U"– 3:33
"Play Games" – 4:24
"Skit" – 0.47
"Na true" – 5:04
"Angel Gabriella" – 5:04
"Skit" – 0:27
"Faze Alone" – 4:24
"OK" – 5:07
"All of my days ft. Niyola" – 5:22
"Trust in me" – 3:47
"Share my heart" – 5:03
"Faze Alone [Remix]" – 5:38
"Tears from your eyes" – 4:31
"Skit" – 0:09
"Thank You" – 5:01
"Outro" – 1:28

References
Faze- Faze Alone album 
Album Sales 

2004 albums
Faze (musician) albums
Albums produced by OJB Jezreel
Albums produced by Cobhams Asuquo